Piper clathratum is a species of pepper plant in the family Piperaceae. It is endemic to Ecuador.

References

 All IUCN Red List of Threatened Species

clathratum
Endemic flora of Ecuador
Critically endangered flora of South America
Taxa named by Casimir de Candolle
Taxonomy articles created by Polbot